Jonathan Freeman (born February 5, 1950) is an American actor and singer. He is known for voicing Jafar in Disney's Aladdin franchise, as well as the Kingdom Hearts franchise and the 2011 Aladdin musical.

Early life
Freeman was born in Bay Village, Ohio on February 5, 1950. He graduated from Ohio University.

Career
As well as being the voice of Jafar in Aladdin, a role he once said he's called in to reprise every 3 to 6 months, Freeman is also known for being the puppeteer for Tito Swing of the Jukebox Band (Flexitoon Puppets) on the PBS series Shining Time Station. Freeman reprised his role as Jafar in the direct-to-video sequel to Aladdin, The Return of Jafar.

In 1994, he was nominated for a Tony Award for Best Featured Actor in a Musical for his role in She Loves Me. Additionally, he appeared in the Broadway revival productions of How to Succeed in Business Without Really Trying, The Producers, On the Town, and 42nd Street, during which his caricature was drawn for Sardi's restaurant in 2002.

Freeman can be heard on the 1997 Varèse Sarabande studio recording of the flop 1965 musical Drat! The Cat!.

He was also seen on stage as Cogsworth in Disney's Beauty and the Beast, and originated the role of Grimsby in Disney's Broadway production of The Little Mermaid.

Freeman reprised his role as Jafar in the Hercules crossover with Aladdin.

Freeman began his run starring as Admiral Boom and the Bank Chairman in the Broadway production of Mary Poppins on December 12, 2009.

Freeman also reprised his role as Jafar on stage in the new musical adaptation of Aladdin, which played at Seattle's 5th Avenue Theatre from July 7–31, 2011. He reprised the role in the Broadway production, which opened in March 2014 at the New Amsterdam Theatre, and he is the only actor from the original cast of the animated film to do so. Also, he reprised the role in the special West End performance was filmed shot on location at the London's Prince Edward Theatre on August 31, 2019. After nearly eight years with the show, Freeman played his final performance with the company on January 23, 2022.

Filmography

Film

Television and web
{| class="wikitable"
|-
! Year !! Title !! Role !! Notes
|-
| rowspan="2"| 1989 || K.I.D.S. TV News || D.J. McCaw || Unknown episodes
|-
| The Days and Nights of Molly Dodd || Waiter #2 || Episode: "Here's a Cute Way to Wrap up the Holiday Season"
|-
| 1989–1995 || Shining Time Station || Tito Swing || 58 episodes
|-
| rowspan="2"| 1990 || Mathnet || Joshua || Episode: "The Case of the Unkidnapping"
|-
| Shining Time Station: 'Tis a Gift || Tito Swing || (TV special) 
|-
| 1995 || Aladdin on Ice || Jafar (voice) || (TV special) (uncredited)
|-
| 1996–1998 || Remember WENN || Rollie Pruitt || Episodes: "Christmas in the Airwaves""Who's Scott Sherwood?""The New Actor""The Importance of Being Betty""Happy Homecomings""Some Time, Some Station"
|-
| 1998 || Hercules || rowspan="2"| Jafar (voice) || Episode: "Hercules and the Arabian Night"
|-
| 2001–2003 || House of Mouse || Episodes: "The Stolen Cartoons""Donald's Lamp Trade""Max's Embarrassing Date""Where's Minnie?""Donald and the Aracuan Bird""House of Crime""House of Magic""Pete's House of Villains""Pete's Christmas Caper""Halloween with Hades"
|-
| 2002 || Teamo Supremo|| Zomnambulist (voice) || Episode: "Things That Go Bump in the Night!"
|-
| 2005–2006 || American Dragon: Jake Long || Eli Excelsior Pandarus  Jack Frost (voice) || Episodes: "The Heist""Eye of the Beholder""A Befuddled Mind"
|-
| 2008 || Gossip Girl || Butler || Episode: "The Ex-Files"
|-
| 2006–2009 || Law & Order: Criminal Intent || Mr. Marty Krebs  Wallace Thayer || Episodes: "Identity Crisis""The Healer"
|-
| 2010 || Law & Order: Special Victims Unit || Bobby || Episode: "Merchandise"
|-
| 2011 || Submissions Only || Greg Bonomelli || Episode: "The Miller/Hennigan Act"
|-
| 2016 || Elementary || Holder || Episode: "How the Sausage Is Made"
|-
|Nov. 22, 2016||Broadway.com'''s Role Call: "Jonathan Freeman of Aladdin"||Himself
|-
|Nov. 25, 2017||Oh My Disney Show: "Watch a Disney Movie With ... Aladdin's Jonathan Freeman"||Himself||S2, EP 34
|-
|Aug. 31, 2019|| TODAY || Himself || "Jonathan Freeman, Voice of Jafar, Reveals A Secret To Playing Aladdin Villain"
|-
| 2022 || Helluva Boss || Paimon and Cash Buckzo || Episode: "The Circus"
|}

Video games

Theatre work

Broadway credits

 Aladdin as Jafar (Original Broadway Cast)
 Mary Poppins as Admiral Boom and the Bank Chairman (Replacement)
 The Little Mermaid as Grimsby (Original Broadway Cast)
 Beauty and the Beast as Cogsworth (Replacement)
 The Producers as Roger De Bris (Replacement)
 42nd Street as Bert Barry 
 On the Town as Pitkin W. Bridgework 
 How to Succeed in Business Without Really Trying as Mr. Bratt 
 She Loves Me as Headwaiter – Nominated – Tony Award for Best Featured Actor in a Musical
 Platinum as Minky 
 Sherlock Holmes as Lightfoot McTague (Replacement – RSC Transfer)

Off Broadway credits
 Of Thee I Sing as Senator Lyons (City Center Encores)
 Finian's Rainbow as Finian (Irish Repertory)
 A Class Act as Lehman (Manhattan Theatre Club)
 An Empty Plate In The Cafe Du Grand Boeuf as Claude (Primary Stages)
 Sail Away as Joe (Carnegie Hall)
 Wall To Wall as Frank Loesser (Symphony Space)
 Li'l Abner as Dr. Rasmussen (City Center Encores)
 On The Town as Pitkin W. Bridgework (Public Theater/Delacourte)
 In A Pig's Valise as Zoot/Gut (Second Stage)
 Claptrap as Harvey (Manhattan Theater Club)
 Bertrano as Louie/Momo (Primary Stages)
 Confessions Of Billie as Conrad Gerhardt (Performing Garage)
 Thirteen Days To Broadway as Cy (890 Studios)
 Babes In Arms as Steve (Playwrights' Horizon)
 Pinocchio as Fire Eater (Marionette Theater)
 The Miser as Cleante (Greenwich Mews)
 Le Bourgeois Gentilhomme as Dancing Master

Regional/Stock credits
 Restoration Comedy as Sir Novelty (Seattle Repertory Theater)
 A Christmas Carol as Ebenezer Scrooge (Bay Street Theater)
 You Can't Take It with You as Boris Kolenkov (Bay Street Theater)
 An Empty Plate In The Cafe Du Grand Boeuf as Claude (Berkshire Theater Festival)
 Peter Pan as Hook/Mr. Darling (Austin Musical Theater)
 How To Succeed in Business Without Really Trying as Bert Bratt (La Jolla Playhouse)
 Fortinbras as Claudius (La Jolla Playhouse)
 Babes In Toyland as Gonzorgo (Houston Grand Opera)
 A Funny Thing Happened on the Way to the Forum as Marcus Lycus (La Jolla Playhouse/Orange County Performing Arts Center)
 The Flowering Peach as Shem (Coconut Grove Playhouse)
 Emigration Of Adam as Issac Kurtzik (Williamstown Theater Festival)
 Gay Divorce as Teddy (Goodspeed Opera House)
 The Student Prince as Hubert (Milwaukee Melody Top)
 Can-Can as Boris
 Arsenic and Old Lace as Jonathan (Meadowbrook Theater)
 The Desert Song as Benny (Coachlight Theater)
 George Washington Slept Here as Steve (Berkshire Theater Festival)
 How to Succeed in Business Without Really Trying'' as Bud Frump (Coachlight Theater)

Soundtrack

References

External links

1950 births
American male musical theatre actors
American male television actors
American male video game actors
American male voice actors
American male comedians
Living people
Male actors from Cleveland
Ohio University alumni